Peckham Brook is a river in Chenango County, New York. It flows into Unadilla River northwest of Sidney and west-northwest of Mount Moses.

References

Rivers of New York (state)
Rivers of Chenango County, New York